The Alekseyev I-21 was a Soviet twin-engined jet fighter, built in the late 1940s. Two prototypes were constructed with the designation of I-211, of which one was converted into the I-215 with more powerful engines. A third aircraft was built to evaluate the bicycle landing gear arrangement for use in other aircraft. The fighter was not accepted for production as it was inferior to the swept-wing fighters like the Mikoyan-Gurevich MiG-15.

Development
After working as Lavochkin's right-hand man during World War II, Semyon Alekseyev was appointed as Chief Designer of OKB-21 (design bureau) at Gor'kiy. The Council of the People's Commissars directed Alekseyev and other designers to develop jet fighters using more powerful engines than the captured German Jumo 004 and the BMW 003 and their Soviet-built copies. The result of Alekseyev's efforts was the I-21 (Russian: istrebitel (fighter)), which was planned to be produced in several variants.

The I-21 was a twin-engined, all-metal, single-seat jet fighter, with straight laminar flow wings, mid-set on a circular fuselage. The fighter's  Lyul'ka TR-2 turbojet engines were mounted below the wings much like those on the German Messerschmitt Me 262 fighter. Underneath the engine nacelles were hardpoints that could carry  bombs or drop tanks. The slightly swept tail unit was cruciform in layout with the tailplane set at approximately half-fin span with slight dihedral. The aircraft's structure was generally constructed from high-strength B-95 duralumin, although high-strength steel and "Elektron" magnesium alloy were used for some components. A hydraulically retractable tricycle undercarriage was fitted, using twin wheels for the nose and main landing gear. Hydraulically actuated airbrakes were fitted either side of the rear fuselage. Alekseyev initially planned to arm the aircraft with three  Nudelman N-37 autocannon, each with 30 rounds, but later decided upon a pair of  Nudelman-Suranov NS-23 autocannon with 75 rounds per gun.

Design work on the I-210 (I-21 version 0) was concurrent with the I-21, probably as a fall back for any lack of availability of the latter's TR-2 engines. The only significant difference was the substitution of  BMW 003 engines (or the reverse-engineered RD-20), but the ex-German engine's significantly inferior thrust rating meant that it would never meet the I-21's speed requirement. Even replacing the BMW 003 with the slightly more powerful Jumo 004 would not allow the I-210 to meet the speed requirement and the project was cancelled before any metal was cut.

Construction of the first two airframes, designated as the I-211 (I-21 version 1), began at the end of 1946, under extreme pressure by the Ministry of Aircraft Production to complete initial flight testing by 1 August 1947, to enable the aircraft to take part in the Aviation Day Flypast at Tushino on 18 August. While one of the two airframes initially produced was used for static testing, the other was fitted with  Lyul'ka TR-1 turbojet engines because the intended TR-2 was not available. The engines were mounted in the middle of the wing, with the wing spars continued by banjo rings around the engines, much like those on the British Gloster Meteor fighter. Despite pressure from above, the I-211 was unable to participate in the Tushino display.

Flight testing started in late 1947, but only six test flights had been carried out before the I-211 struck a pothole on landing, which collapsed the undercarriage. Even the limited amount of flight testing showed it to be faster than the Sukhoi Su-11 which also used the TR-1 engine. Repairs were carried out and the opportunity taken to replace the troublesome engines with imported  Rolls-Royce Derwent V engines. Alekseyev took the opportunity to upgrade the aircraft to the I-215 configuration which had been in development since before the first flight of the I-211. The substitution of the centrifugal-flow Derwent for the axial-flow TR-1 forced the redesign and enlargement of the nacelles to accommodate the larger engine. The armament was revised to the originally specified N-37 guns, although the ammunition capacity was marginally increased to 35 rounds per gun. Despite good results from flight testing, the I-215 lost out in production orders to the newer generation of swept-winged fighters.

A second I-215 was built to an order from OKB-1 as the I-215D (dooblyor, second prototype), to evaluate the bicycle or tandem landing gear configuration. It used wider-diameter paired wheels in a tandem arrangement that retracted into the fuselage, along with small outrigger wheels under the engine nacelles which retracted into fairings. The main undercarriage of the I-215D also incorporated a kneeling feature which could increase the incidence of the aircraft by 3° to assist take-off. Trials with this undercarriage arrangement were successful and paved the way for its use in other Soviet aircraft, including Dr. Brunolf Baade's Aircraft 150, then under development.

Variants
 I-210 - The initial version with BMW 003 or Tumanskii RD-20 engines, project only.
 I-211 - The first flyable example completed as the I-211 with Lyul'ka TR-1 engines, rebuilt as the I-215.
 I-211S - I-211 with swept wing and unswept tail, project only.
 I-215 - The re-built I-211 with Rolls-Royce Derwent V engines and other minor modifications.
 I-215D - Bicycle-undercarriage I-215 built to order of OKB-1.

Specifications (I-211 as tested)

See also

References

Bibliography
 Gordon, Yefim & Kommissarov, Dmitry. Early Soviet Jet Fighters. Manchester, UK: Hikoki Publications, 2014. .
 Gunston, Bill. The Osprey Encyclopedia of Russian Aircraft 1875–1995. London: Osprey, 1995. .

Further reading
 Green, William & Swanborough, Gordon. "The Complete Book of Fighters". London: Salamander Books. 1994.

External links
 I-215 at Ugolok Neba site (in Russian)

Alekseyev aircraft
Abandoned military aircraft projects of the Soviet Union
1940s Soviet fighter aircraft
Twinjets
Aircraft first flown in 1947